The Admiral Commanding, Orkneys and Shetlands was an operational commander of the Royal Navy. He was charged with the administration of the Orkney and Shetland Islands and operating and defending the fleet base at Scapa Flow that was the main anchorage for both the Home Fleet and Grand Fleet at various times.

History
An Admiral Commanding for the Orkneys and Shetlands was appointed twice, on the outbreak of war, to provide for the defence and administration of the main base for the Home Fleet. The Admiral Commanding was responsible, under the orders of the Commander-in-Chief, Home Fleet, for administration of naval defences, naval establishments, and shore duties generally in Orkney and Shetland.

During the First World War and the Second World War the Rear-Admiral, Scapa Flow served under him, with a position similar to that of an Admiral Superintendent of a dockyard port. Directly under his orders were the Northern Patrol, Shetlands Patrols, the Officer Commanding Troops Orkney, the Officer Commanding Troops Shetlands, the Admiralty Port Officer Kirkwall, the Rear-Admiral commanding the local minefields and the officers responsible for the extended defences, the local defence flotilla and the Orkney Trawler Patrols. He was responsible for the patrolling of the area from Wick to Cape Wrath.

Shore establishments included HMS Pyramus (shore establishment) at Kirkwall; HMS Proserpine (shore establishment) at Lyness; and HMS Fox (shore establishment) at Lerwick.

During the Second World War the Rear-Admiral, Scapa Flow continued to serve under him.

First World War 
Included:

Subordinate commanders First World War
Source:

Flag Officer Scapa Flow/Rear Admiral Scapa
This officer's role was similar to that of Admiral Superintendent of a dockyard port.

Flag Officer Shetlands

Naval units, First World War 
Included:

Second World War 
Watson lists the 6th M/S Flotilla 7.41-12.42, which may have been under direct command of the Home Fleet, and the 15th M/S Flotilla 4.42-2.44 [Bangors] operated under the orders of the Admiral Commanding. The Admiral's flag was flown aboard HMS  in Scapa Flow.

The Northern Patrol was based within the Orkney and Shetlands area, but was not responsible to the Admiral Commanding Orkneys and Shetlands. Its ships were dispersed by 1941.

Admirals Commanding:

Flag Officer, Scapa Flow/Rear-Admiral Scapa

Admiral-superintendent Lyness

Admiral-superintendent Orkney

Notes

References 

 Harley, Simon and Lovell Tony, Admiral Commanding, Orkneys and Shetlands (2015), http://www.dreadnoughtproject.org (main source for this article)

</ref>

O
Military units and formations established in 1914
Military units and formations disestablished in 1945
Military units and formations of the Royal Navy in World War I
Military units and formations of the Royal Navy in World War II